Rhodopina nasui is a species of beetle in the family Cerambycidae. It was described by Komiya and Kusama in 1974.

References

nasui
Beetles described in 1974